Martha McPhee (born 1965) is an American novelist whose work focuses on American social and financial mobility. Her second novel was a 2002 National Book Award finalist, and she has been the recipient of a National Endowment for the Arts grant and a John Simon Guggenheim Foundation fellowship.

Career 

Martha McPhee received a National Endowment for the Arts grant to complete her first novel, Bright Angel Time, which was published in 1997 and was a New York Times Notable Book.  Her second novel, Gorgeous Lies, a follow-up to Bright Angel Time, was a finalist for the National Book Award in 2002. In 2003, McPhee won a Guggenheim Fellowship for fiction. Her third novel, L'America, was published in 2006.  Her fourth novel, Dear Money, set during the recent financial crisis, was published in 2010, and her fifth novel, An Elegant Woman, was published in 2020. Her work has appeared in several literary journals included The New Yorker and Harper's Bazaar.

Personal life
McPhee is the daughter of notable literary journalist John McPhee and his first wife, photographer Pryde Brown. She has three sisters: fellow novelist Jenny, photographer Laura, and architectural historian Sarah. She lived with her mother, step-father, three sisters, and five step-sisters on a farm outside of Princeton, New Jersey, graduated from Bowdoin College in Brunswick, Maine in 1987, and received her M.F.A. from Columbia University in 1997. She currently lives in New York City, where she teaches at Hofstra University. She has two children, Livia and Jasper Svenvold McPhee.

Published works 
Bright Angel Time (1997)
Girls: Ordinary Girls and Their Extraordinary Pursuits (2000) (coauthored)
Gorgeous Lies (2002)
L'America (2006)
Dear Money (2010)
An Elegant Woman (2020)

References

External links 
Hofstra faculty profile for McPhee
Author website

20th-century American novelists
21st-century American novelists
20th-century American women writers
21st-century American women writers
American women novelists
Bowdoin College alumni
Columbia University School of the Arts alumni
Living people
1965 births